The Georgia version of the National Wrestling Alliance (NWA) Southern Heavyweight Championship was a secondary singles championship used in Georgia Championship Wrestling off-and-on from 1948 to 1972.

The title is one of many versions of the NWA Southern Heavyweight Championship. Other versions have been used in Florida and the Tennessee cities of Knoxville and Memphis.

Title history
Silver marks in the title history indicate periods of unknown lineage. An  placed after a date indicates that a title change occurred no later than the date listed.

See also
List of National Wrestling Alliance championships
NWA Southern Heavyweight Championship (Florida version)
NWA Southern Heavyweight Championship (Tennessee version)

References

Georgia Championship Wrestling championships
Heavyweight wrestling championships
National Wrestling Alliance championships
Regional professional wrestling championships
Professional wrestling in Georgia (U.S. state)